Proclus (died 24 July 446) was an archbishop of Constantinople. He is venerated as a saint in the Catholic Church, the Eastern Catholic Churches, the Eastern Orthodox Church, and Oriental Orthodoxy.

Biography
Proclus became secretary to Archbishop Atticus of Constantinople (406–425). Saint Proclus was the friend and disciple of Saint John Chrysostom who ordained him deacon and priest. Atticus' successor, Sisinnius I (426–427), consecrated him Bishop of Cyzicus, but the Nestorians there refused to receive him, and he remained at Constantinople. On the death of Sisinnius, the famous Nestorius succeeded as Archbishop of Constantinople (428–431), and early in 429, on a festival of the Theotokos (Virgin Mary), Proclus preached his celebrated sermon on the Incarnation, which was later inserted in the beginning of the Acts of the Council of Ephesus.

When Archbishop Maximianus (431–434) died on Great and Holy Thursday, Proclus was immediately enthroned by the permission of the Emperor Theodosius II and the bishops gathered at Constantinople. His first care was the funeral of his predecessor, and he then sent to both Patriarchs Cyril of Alexandria and John of Antioch the usual synodical letters announcing his appointment, both of whom approved of it.

In 436 the bishops of Armenia consulted Proclus upon certain doctrines prevalent in their country and attributed to Theodore of Mopsuestia, asking for their condemnation. Proclus replied the next year in the celebrated letter known as the Tome to the Armenians, which he sent to the Eastern bishops, asking them to sign it and to join in condemning the doctrines arraigned by the Armenians. They approved of the letters, but from admiration of Theodore hesitated to condemn the doctrines attributed to him. Proclus replied that while he desired the extracts subjoined to his Tome to be condemned, he had not attributed them to Theodore or any individual, not desiring the condemnation of any person.

A rescript from Theodosius procured by Proclus, declaring his wish that all should live in peace and that no imputation should be made against anyone who died in communion with the church, appeased the storm. The whole affair showed conspicuously the moderation and tact of Proclus. In 438, he transferred the relics of his old master, Saint John Chrysostom, from Comana back to Constantinople, where he interred them with great honour in the Church of the Twelve apostles. This action reconciled to the church those of Saint John's adherents who had separated themselves in consequence of the deposition as Archbishop which they regarded as having been unjust.

In 439, at the request of a deputation from Caesarea in Cappadocia, Proclus selected as their new bishop Thalassius, who was about to be appointed praetorian prefect of the East.

In the time of Proclus the Trisagion came into use. The occasion is said to have been a time when violent earthquakes lasted for four months at Constantinople, so that the people were obliged to leave the city and encamp in the fields.

Proclus died most probably in July, 446. He appears to have been wise, moderate, and conciliatory, desirous, while strictly adhering to Orthodoxy himself, to win over those who differed from him by persuasion rather than force.

Works
The works of Proclus consist of 20 sermons (some of doubtful authenticity). Five were published by Cardinal Mai, of which 3 are preserved only in a Syriac version, the Greek being lost; 7 letters, along with several addressed to him by other persons; and a few fragments of other letters and sermons.

Proclus was cited by Cardinal John Henry Newman for his work on Mariology and his strong support of the conciliar dogma on the Theotokos.

Feast day
The Eastern Orthodox Church celebrates his feast day on November 20. The Catholic Church lists him on October 24.

References

Attribution

Further reading
 
 
 Prologue from Ochrid by St. Nikolai Velimirović
 Constas, Nicholas (2003). Proclus of Constantinople and the Cult of the Virgin in Late Antiquity: Homilies 1-5, Texts and Translations. Leiden: Brill.

External links
 http://www.santiebeati.it/dettaglio/74960
 http://www.catholic.org/saints/saint.php?saint_id=5487

446 deaths
Saints from Constantinople
Saints from Roman Anatolia
Proclus
5th-century Christian saints
Year of birth unknown
Bishops of Cyzicus